Abzal Talgatuly Beysebekov (Abzal Talğatūly Beisebekov; born 30 November 1992) is a Kazakh football player, who plays for Astana in the Kazakhstan Premier League.

Career

Club career
Beysebekov began his career in 2008 with FC Kairat in Kazakhstan Premier League when he was 15 years old. Initially played as a forward, later he was frequently used as a defender due to Kazakhstan Premier League regulation for each team to have at least one player younger than 21 years old on field known as "limitchik". "Limitchik" players tend to be put in "less risky" positions such as side defenders and technically and physically skilled Beysebekov was used in such role for a few seasons, though, he could still play as a forward in Kazakhstan U-21 team. 

In February 2014 Beysebekov was joined Korona Kielce on a six-month loan deal, joining fellow Kazakhstan international, Sergei Khizhnichenko. Beysebekov scored on his first, and only goal for Korona Kielce on 27 May 2014.

Prior to the start of the 2021 season, Beysebekov was made captain of Astana.

International career
Beysebekov has played for all national youth teams of Kazakhstan in 2008–2013.

Statistics

Club

International

Statistics accurate as of match played 4 June 2021

Honors
 Astana
 Kazakhstan Premier League (6): 2014, 2015, 2016, 2017, 2018, 2019
 Kazakhstan Cup (2): 2012, 2016
 Kazakhstan Super Cup (4): 2015, 2018, 2019, 2020

References

1992 births
Living people
Kazakhstani footballers
Kazakhstan international footballers
Kazakhstan under-21 international footballers
Kazakhstani expatriate footballers
Kazakhstan Premier League players
Ekstraklasa players
FC Kairat players
FC Vostok players
FC Astana players
Korona Kielce players
Expatriate footballers in Poland
Place of birth missing (living people)
Association football midfielders
Sportspeople from Almaty